Junonia hadrope, the Volta pansy, is a butterfly in the family Nymphalidae. It is found in Ghana (the Volta Region).

References

Hadrope
Butterflies of Africa
Endemic fauna of Ghana
Butterflies described in 1847